Matt Gutman (born December 5, 1977) is an American reporter for ABC News. He is the network's Chief National Correspondent and appears on various programs for the network. He was the host of the U.S. weekly TV series Sea Rescue when it ended in September 2018.  He is also the author of the book, The Boys in the Cave: Deep Inside the Impossible Rescue in Thailand about the international rescue of the soccer team from a cave in Thailand in July 2018.

Early life and education 
Matthew A. Gutman was born on December 5, 1977, in Princeton, New Jersey. Gutman attended Newark Academy, where he was honored as a scholar-athlete football player. He graduated from Williams College in 2000.

Career 

Gutman started as a freelance reporter in Argentina in late 2000. His first published article was for the now-defunct English-language Buenos Aires Daily. He then worked for the Jerusalem Post based in Israel from 2001 to 2005 covering the Israeli-Palestinian conflict. He also worked for USA Today before joining ABC News Radio in 2006. Gutman lived in the Middle East for nearly eight years, covering most major conflicts, including the wars in Iraq and Afghanistan, Syria and Lebanon, and filing dispatches from nearly every country in the region. He moved to Miami, Florida for ABC News in 2008 and began appearing on various programs and platforms for the network including ABC World News Tonight, Good Morning America, Nightline and the network's magazine show 20/20. He has filed reports from more than 40 countries for ABC News over the past decade. In 2014, he took over the hosting duties for Sea Rescue and hosted about 120 episodes of the show. In late 2016, while reporting on the collapsing health care system of Venezuela, he was detained for five days by police and intelligence services.

His book The Boys in the Cave, an account of the Tham Luang cave rescue, was published in November 2018. It has been translated into six languages.

Suspension and return

In January 2020, Gutman was suspended by ABC News for incorrectly reporting that, during the death of Kobe Bryant in the 2020 Calabasas helicopter crash, all four of Bryant's children had died when only Bryant’s 13-year-old daughter Gianna "Gigi" was on board the helicopter and perished in the crash.

Later that year, Gutman resumed reporting for ABC and appeared on the October 23, 2020, episode of 20/20 entitled "The Perfect Liar," in which he interviewed jailhouse informant Paul Skalnik and deathrow inmate James Dailey.

However, in February 2021, Gutman was briefly subjected to an additional suspension after allegedly violating Covid-19 company policy when visiting a Los Angeles hospital during the pandemic. Gutman, who lives in L.A., has done extensive reporting on the Covid-19 crisis.

References

External links 
ABC Medianet biography

1977 births
ABC News personalities
American television news anchors
Williams College alumni
Journalists from Florida
Journalists from New Jersey
Living people
Newark Academy alumni
People from Westfield, New Jersey